Savannah High School is a public secondary school in Savannah, Missouri, United States serving grades 9 through 12.

It is in the Savannah R-III School District, which has been accredited with distinction four of the last five years.

The principal is Sarah Portenier. The enrollment is just over 800 students. Additions include a new commons area and a library.

Notable alumni
 Dan Hegeman, Missouri state senator (1981)

Quizbowl
Savannah High School is home to one of Missouri's premier quizbowl teams, having won six state championships. They have done well on a national level at the ASCN national Tournament of Champions, placing 7th in 2003 and 2004, 5th in 2005, 4th in 1995, and winning the championship in 1988. The quizbowl is composed of a Junior Varsity team and a Varsity team. The JV team won state in 2006 and 2007.

Debate and Forensics

Savannah High School is also home to one of the winningest Speech and Debate squads in the Midland Empire Conference and greater Kansas City area, winning every conference championship since its inception, and qualifying numerous competitors to the Missouri State High School Activities Association Tournament and National Forensic League National Tournament.

In recent years, Savannah has placed well at the state and national levels:
 2001: A 2nd place MSHSAA State Tournament Humorous Interpretation, 2nd place NFL Nationals Video Speaking Contest
 2002: A 6th place MSHSAA State Tournament Dramatic Interpretation, a State Champion Extemporaneous Speaking
 2005: An 8th place MSHSAA State Tournament Storytelling
 2006: A 5th place MSHSAA State Tournament Poetry, a 7th place Storytelling, a 5th place Dramatic Interp., a 2nd place Humorous Interp., 7th place NFL Nationals Humorous Interpretation
 2007: A 5th place MSHSAA State Tournament Poetry, a 5th place Extemp, a 3rd place Lincoln Douglas Debater, 14th place Poetry Interp. NFL Nationals
 2008: A 2nd Place DI, 2nd place HI, 2nd place Storytelling, 3rd place Oratory, 3rd place Extemp, 6th place Poetry, Quarterfinalist P.F.D. team, and a Semifinalist L.D. debater at MSHSAA State. A 3rd place Oratory (winning the Professor's Bowl for placing 1st in the final round), and a 5th place Poetry at NFL Nationals
 2009: A 5th place Poetry at the MSHSAA State Tournament, two semi-finalists in Student Congress at the NFL National Tournament
 2010: A 10th place in Student Congress, a 10th place in Duo Interpretation, a 7th place in Domestic Extemporaneous speaking at the NFL National Tournament
 2011: Two semi-finalists in Student Congress, an octo-finalist and a quarterfinalist in Domestic Extemporaneous speaking, and a quarterfinalist in International Extemporaneous speaking
 2013: Noah Jermain won the Humorous Interpretation event at the NFL National Tournament.
 2020: Luca Freccia was awarded 7th place at the National tournament in Original Oratory

Savannah soccer team
Savannah High School began girls' and boys' soccer teams in 2005. In the 2006 season, the boys' team won their first game. In 2011 and 2012 the girls' team won back-to-back district titles.

Savage football
Savannah football has been having success in recent years as they have gained two conference titles and one district title in the past three years. In 2011 the Savages lost to Webb City 28-24 with four seconds left for the semi-final game. The record for the longest field goal at savage field is 76 yards, accomplished on September 21, 1974 by Lenny “The Leg” Legkowski.

Mascot Controversy
On June 6, 2020, a petition was started on Change.org by to remove the Savage mascot due to its racist connotations. The use of terms and images referring to Native Americans and First Nations as the name or mascot for a sports team is a topic of public controversy in the United States and Canada. The American Psychological Association, United States Commission on Civil Rights, and The National Conference for Community and Justice are among those who have called for a ban on Native American mascots. Such mascots are said to misrepresent, distort, and trivialize many aspects of Native American culture; and mascot stereotypes have a negative impact on Native American lives.

A counter-petition was launched on June 29. The Savannah R3 School District's Board of Education met on July 14, 2020, in an open meeting in which community members voiced their opinions on the issue. Previous attempts to change the mascot have been made, notably in 1993 and 2018. On October 14, 2020, the Board of Education voted to create a committee to determine the fate of the mascot. On March 22, 2021, the committee returned with a tie vote, 4-4, in favor of changing or keeping the mascot, pushing the decision back to the school board. Finally, on April 14, 2021, the Savannah R3 School board voted to keep the "Savages" name but phase out the use of Native American imagery, in a 4-3 vote that concluded with one board member resigning on the spot.

References

External links

Midland Empire Conference
Public high schools in Missouri
Schools in Andrew County, Missouri
Native American-related controversies
Race-related controversies in the United States